The West African Court of Appeal (WACA) was a court which served as the appellate court for the British colonies of Gold Coast, Nigeria, Gambia, and Sierra Leone.

History
The WACA was first established in 1867 as the appellate court for British possessions in western Africa. It was abolished in 1874, but was revived in 1928. Jurisdiction over Nigeria was ended in 1954. The court became defunct with the independence of the states which it served. The court was based in Sierra Leone.

Decisions of the court could be appealed with leave to the Judicial Committee of the Privy Council.

Sir James Henley Coussey was appointed President of the court in 1955.

Notes

References
Bonny Ibhawoh, Imperial Justice: Africans in Empire's Court (Oxford: Oxford University Press, 2013)

See also
 East African Court of Appeal

External links
 Description and Holding Information | 1930-1960, West Africa Court of Appeals, Judgments
WEST AFRICAN COURT OF APPEAL (CRIMINAL CASES).

Defunct courts
1867 establishments in the British Empire
Gold Coast (British colony)
Colonial Nigeria
Gambia Colony and Protectorate
Sierra Leone Colony and Protectorate
Appellate courts
Courts and tribunals established in 1867